Putian cuisine, also known as Henghwa cuisine or Henghua cuisine, is a style of Chinese cuisine originating from the Putian people of Putian, Fujian Province.  It is a style of Fujian cuisine.

Since Putian is a coastal area, ingredients such as seaweed, oysters, clams and other seafood are commonly used in Putian cuisine.  

Putian cuisine is also eaten by the Chinese diaspora in South-East Asia.  The eponymous "Putien" restaurant in Singapore, originally a simple kopitiam, won a Michelin star in 2016 and has since franchised itself into an international chain.

Notable dishes

References

 
Regional cuisines of China